The Grand Hotel is a hotel in a Grade II Listed Building in Broad Street in Bristol, England. It opened in 1869 and has been visited by several celebrities, including the Beatles and the Rolling Stones. A major refurbishment programme took place in 2017.

Location
The Grand Hotel is on Broad Street in the Old City Corner. It a short distance from St John's Arch, one of the original gateways to Bristol.

History
The hotel was constructed by John Foster and Joseph Wood, replacing two pubs in this location. Construction started in 1864, and it opened in 1869. It was originally known as the White Lion, before being renamed as the Grand Hotel in 1874. It was constructed of limestone ashlar, in a rectangular Italianate Renaissance style. An attic storey was added during the 20th century. The interior was also extensively altered during this time.

In World War II, the hotel was used as a residence for various agents, politicians and royalty and served as a link between London and Bristol Airport. It was Grade II listed in 1966.

The hotel was renovated in 2017 in a £5 million refurbishment program, and is now known as the Mercure Bristol Grand Hotel. It has 155 rooms, and is extensively decorated with art by local Bristol artists.

In 2013, the Russian emigre Nikolai Glushkov became ill there, in a suspected poisoning incident.

Cultural references
Several celebrities have stayed at the hotel, including The Beatles, Cary Grant and Leslie Howard. In 1964, the Rolling Stones were refused entry into the hotel's bar, because they were not wearing jackets.

The hotel was featured in the BBC production of The Trial of Christine Keeler in 2019. During filming, it was briefly closed.

References 

Hotels in England
Grade II listed hotels
Grade II listed buildings in Bristol